In molecular biology, the red chlorophyll catabolite reductase (RCC reductase) family of proteins consists of several red chlorophyll catabolite reductase (RCC reductase) proteins. Red chlorophyll catabolite (RCC) reductase (RCCR) and pheophorbide (Pheide) a oxygenase (PaO) catalyse the key reaction of chlorophyll catabolism, porphyrin macrocycle cleavage of Pheide a to a primary fluorescent catabolite (pFCC).

References

Further reading

EC 1.3.1
Protein families